Jedd Garet is an American sculptor, painter and printmaker, who was born in 1955.  He was raised in California, studied at the Rhode Island School of Design, and received a BFA from the School of Visual Arts in New York City.

Influenced by surrealist painter Giorgio de Chirico, Garet uses garish colors in jarring contrasts to explore relationships between nature, man, and art.  He combines human figures, classical architectural fragments and abstraction in narrative works, and is known for his amorphous life forms. Nothing Too Strange and Beautiful, in the collection of the Honolulu Museum of Art demonstrates this phase of the artist's monumental sculpture.  It was originally created as a folly for a sculpture park exhibition at Wave Hill in New York City.  In later work, figures, trees and other more recognizable objects were added to the minimalist flat ground, creating tension.

The Fine Arts Museums of San Francisco, the Honolulu Museum of Art, The Museum of Modern Art (New York City), the Phoenix Art Museum (Phoenix, Arizona), the Portland Art Museum (Portland, Oregon), the Tate Gallery (London), and the Whitney Museum of American Art (New York City) are among the public collections holding works by Jedd Garet.

References
 Curley, Mallory, A Cookie Mueller Encyclopedia, Randy Press, 2010.
 Honolulu Museum of Art, Spalding House Self-guided Tour, Sculpture Garden, 2014, p. 1
 Pincus-Witten, Robert, Jedd Garet: Nature as Artifice, Santa Fe, New Mexico, Twelvetrees Press, 1984 
 Tate Gallery, The Tate Gallery 1984-86: Illustrated Catalogue of Acquisitions Including Supplement to Catalogue of Acquisitions 1982-84, Tate Gallery, London 1988, pp. 152–3

Footnotes

20th-century American painters
American male painters
21st-century American painters
Modern sculptors
Living people
1955 births
20th-century American sculptors
American male sculptors
20th-century American printmakers
Rhode Island School of Design alumni
School of Visual Arts alumni
20th-century American male artists